In the 2014–15 Aris Thessaloniki B.C. season, Aris Thessaloniki finished in 4th place in the Greek Basket League, and reached the quarterfinals of the Greek Cup. Aris Thessaloniki did not participate in any European-wide competition.

Roster

Competitions

Overview

Total Overview

Greek Basket League

Greek Basket League

Regular season

Playoffs

Greek Cup

References

Aris B.C. seasons